The Terror is an American supernatural horror drama anthology television series developed for AMC. The series is named after Dan Simmons's 2007 novel, which serves as the basis for the first season. It premiered on March 25, 2018, with a second season, subtitled Infamy, premiering on August 12, 2019.

The first season was developed by David Kajganich and is a fictionalized account of Captain Sir John Franklin's lost expedition to the Arctic from 1845 to 1848. Kajganich and Soo Hugh serve as co-showrunners. Featured in the cast are Jared Harris as Captain Francis Crozier, Tobias Menzies as Commander James Fitzjames, Paul Ready as Dr. Harry Goodsir, and Ciarán Hinds as Franklin. The second season was co-created by Alexander Woo and Max Borenstein and is mostly set in an American-run Japanese internment camp during World War II. It stars Derek Mio, Kiki Sukezane, Cristina Rodlo, Shingo Usami, Naoko Mori, Miki Ishikawa, and George Takei.

Premise

The Terror

The first season begins with the Royal Navy's polar explorer ships  and  having recently left Beechey Island in the Canadian Arctic Archipelago, heading south toward King William Island into uncharted territory, seeking to find and confirm the existence and navigability of the fabled Northwest Passage. The ships are soon frozen and trapped in the ice, and those aboard must survive the harsh weather conditions and each other, while being stalked by an elusive menace.

The Terror: Infamy
The second season takes place on the west coast of the United States during World War II and centers on the Japanese folklore of bakemono, "an uncanny specter that menaces a Japanese American community from its home in Southern California to the internment camps to the war in the Pacific".

Cast and characters

Season 1

Main
 Jared Harris as Captain Francis Crozier, Commanding Officer, HMS Terror, and expedition second-in-command
 Tobias Menzies as Commander James Fitzjames, Executive Officer, HMS Erebus
 Paul Ready as Assistant Surgeon Harry Goodsir, HMS Erebus
 Adam Nagaitis as Caulker's Mate Cornelius Hickey, HMS Terror
 Ian Hart as Sailing Master Thomas Blanky, HMS Terror
 Nive Nielsen as Lady Silence, a Netsilik woman
 Ciarán Hinds as Captain Sir John Franklin, Commanding Officer, HMS Erebus, and expedition leader

HMS Erebus

HMS Terror

Others

Season 2

Main
 Derek Mio as Chester Nakayama (born Taizo Tanabe)
 Kiki Sukezane as Yuko Tanabe
 Cristina Rodlo as Luz Ojeda
 Shingo Usami as Henry Nakayama
 Naoko Mori as Asako Nakayama
 Miki Ishikawa as Amy Yoshida
 George Takei as Nobuhiro Yamato

Recurring

Episodes

Season 1 (2018)

Season 2: Infamy (2019)

Production

Season 1
After the success of the show The Walking Dead, the American cable TV network AMC planned to create a horror TV series based on the novel The Terror. In March 2016, it was confirmed that AMC ordered 10 episodes of the show, with an expected premiere date in 2018.

David Kajganich and Soo Hugh serve as co-showrunners, while Kajganich penned the adaptation. Ridley Scott, Alexandra Milchan, Scott Lambert, David W. Zucker, and Guymon Casady are executive producers. In September 2016, it was announced that Tobias Menzies was cast as a series lead and the showrunners were seeking an Inuit woman, between the ages of 16 and 30, to play an unspecified 'major character', most likely Lady Silence.

Most of the scenes on the ice were created using CGI.

Season 2
The second season, titled The Terror: Infamy,  and consisting of 10 episodes, is co-created by Max Borenstein and Alexander Woo, who also serves as the showrunner.

Derek Mio plays the lead role of Chester Nakayama, a son of Japanese born immigrants who joins the army. George Takei plays Yamato-san, a former fishing captain and community elder who was imprisoned with his family in two Japanese-American internment camps during WWII. Also cast are Kiki Sukezane as Yuko, a mysterious woman from Chester's past; Shingo Usami as Henry Nakayama, Chester's father; and Naoko Mori as Asako Nakayama, Chester's mother; and Miki Ishikawa as Amy, a Nakayama family friend. Takei also serves in a consulting role to ensure the accuracy of historical events and storytelling. C. Thomas Howell was cast as Retired Major Hallowell Bowen, an official with the War Relocation Authority whose "presence looms over the Japanese-American characters in the story."

Josef Kubota Wladyka directed the first two episodes of the season. Production began on January 14, 2019, in Vancouver.

Possible third season
In January 2020, it was reported by Deadline Hollywood that AMC president Sarah Barnett had expressed interest in renewing The Terror for a third season and that AMC and Scott Free Productions were discussing plot ideas.

Release
The first season premiered on AMC in the United States and Canada on March 25, 2018, and concluded on May 21, 2018. It was released worldwide on Amazon Prime Video in every other country where the service is present (except Canada, the UK and some Middle Eastern countries) starting March 26, 2018. Amazon released most of the first season ahead of its broadcast on AMC. In the United Kingdom, The Terror premiered on AMC on April 24, 2018, and BBC Two on March 3, 2021.

Reception

Critical response

Season 1
The first season has received positive reviews from critics. On Rotten Tomatoes, the season has a 94% "certified fresh" rating based on 69 reviews, with an average rating of 8.1/10. The website's critical consensus reads, "A thriller wrapped in a prestige drama package, The Terror makes for gripping, atmospheric supernatural horror." On Metacritic, which uses a weighted average, the season has a score of 76 out of 100, based on 20 critics, indicating "generally favorable reviews".

Season 2
The second season has received positive reviews from critics. On Rotten Tomatoes, the season has a 81% "certified fresh" rating based on 43 reviews, with an average rating of 7.2/10. The website's critical consensus reads, "Real-world and supernatural horrors collide in Infamy, an exceptionally well-crafted ghost story that creeps under the skin and stays there." On Metacritic, the season has a score of 78 out of 100, based on 15 critics, indicating "generally favorable reviews".

Ratings

Season 1

Season 2

Awards and nominations

Notes

References

External links

 
 
  Interview with historical advisor Matthew Betts.

2010s American drama television series
2010s American horror television series
2018 American television series debuts
AMC (TV channel) original programming
English-language television shows
Horror drama television series
Internment of Japanese Americans
Television shows based on American novels
Television series by Scott Free Productions
Television series set in the 1840s
Television series set in the 1940s
Television shows filmed in Croatia
Television shows filmed in Hungary
World War II television drama series
Franklin's lost expedition